Better Times may refer to:

 Krøniken (English: Better Times), a Danish television drama
 Better Times (film), a 1919 silent drama film directed by King Vidor
 Better Times (album), a 1992 album by Black Sorrows.
"Better Times", single by Rhinoceros   from Better Times Are Coming 1970